Gerald Wontner (17 December 1848 – 6 October 1885) was an English cricketer. He played in one first-class match in New Zealand for Canterbury in 1872/73.

See also
 List of Canterbury representative cricketers

References

External links
 

1848 births
1885 deaths
English cricketers
Canterbury cricketers
People from Shoreditch